The Ambassador's Daughter is a 1956 American romantic comedy film directed by Norman Krasna and starring Olivia de Havilland and John Forsythe.

Plot
When a visiting American senator decides to make Paris off-limits to enlisted military personnel, the daughter of the United States Ambassador to France decides to show him that American servicemen can be gentlemen by dating one of them without revealing her lofty social status.  Sergeant Sullivan takes Joan to colorful nightclub cabarets, and on a comical trip up the Eiffel Tower, all the time believing her to be a Dior fashion model.

Thinking she has an emergency back in America, Sullivan offers to buy her an airline ticket, for which she is grateful, until she hears that counterfeit plane tickets are a common scam used by American servicemen to impress girls. Sullivan's friend, the homespun Corporal O'Connor, all the while is a guest of the Ambassador's family and other top brass, and tries to alert Sullivan as to Joan's true identity, but is unable to contact Sullivan (and is sworn to secrecy).

When Sullivan drops into the Dior fashion show one day to look for Joan, he discovers that the staff have never heard of her. However he sees Joan observing the show with her father's friend, the Senator, whom he mistakenly assumes must be her sugar daddy. On their last dinner date, Joan walks out on Sullivan, when he accidentally spills wine on her and offers to take her to his hotel room, thinking he is dishonorable.  Finally, one evening Sullivan and the Ambassador's family, by coincidence, separately attend the same ballet performance of Swan Lake, where during the intermission Sullivan learns her true identity and their misunderstanding is resolved.

Cast

Olivia de Havilland as Joan Fisk
John Forsythe as Sergeant Danny Sullivan
Myrna Loy as Mrs. Cartwright
Adolphe Menjou as Senator Jonathan Cartwright
Tommy Noonan as Corporal Al O'Connor, Danny's friend
Francis Lederer as Prince Nicholas Obelski
Edward Arnold as Ambassador William Fisk
Minor Watson as General Andrew Harvey. This was Watson's last film.

Production
In February 1954 Krasna announced he would write and direct an original film for Jerry Wald at Columbia, Speak to Me of Love. Gene Tierney was to star. In March the title changed to The Ambassador's Daughter.

In April 1954 the deal with Columbia was called off. In January 1955 Van Johnson was announced for the male lead.

The film ended up not being made at Columbia - in February 1955 Krasna signed a two picture deal to write and direct at United Artists; the first was to be The Ambassador's Daughter and the second was Red Roses. The latter ended up not being made.

Olivia de Havilland signed in June. Johnson ended up not appearing in the movie; John Forsythe was cast the following month. Adolphe Menjou joined the film in September.

See also
List of American films of 1956

References

External links

Review of film at Variety

1956 films
1956 romantic comedy films
CinemaScope films
Films directed by Norman Krasna
Films set in Paris
United Artists films
Military humor in film
American romantic comedy films
1950s English-language films
1950s American films